Jonathan Gómez (born 28 July 1985, Asunción, Paraguay) is a Paraguayan football midfielder.

Career
Gómez began his top-flight club career at Cerro Porteño. He later moved to Italy, where he played for Venezia. He then returned to Paraguay and was part of Sportivo Trinidense.

References
 Jonathan Gómez at BDFA.com.ar 

1985 births
Living people
Paraguayan footballers
Paraguayan people of Spanish descent
Cerro Porteño players
Association football midfielders